The Gunnerus Medal is a medal awarded by the learned society Royal Norwegian Society of Sciences and Letters.

It was inaugurated in 1927, and named after Johan Ernst Gunnerus, founder of the learned society. Members of the learned society are eligible to suggest candidates, and the medal is awarded by the board of directors.

Current bearers of the medal are Johannes Moe (since 1988), Stig Strömholm (1997), Olaf I. Rønning (1998), Jørn Sandnes (1999), Gunnar Sundnes (2001), Peder Johan Borgen (2003), Harald A. Øye (2004), Jens Glad Balchen (2006), Olav Smidsrød (2008) and Ivar Giaever (2010).

Awardees

References

Academic awards
Norwegian awards
Royal Norwegian Society of Sciences and Letters